The 1986 Pepsi Canadian Junior Men's Curling Championship was held February 16-22 at the Red Deer Curling Club in Red Deer, Alberta.

Team Manitoba, skipped by future Manitoba Leader of the Opposition Hugh McFadyen and his teammates Jon Mead, Norman Gould, John Lange defeated Saskatchewan in the final, to claim the province's fourth provincial men's junior title. The team would go on to win a silver medal for Canada at the 1987 World Junior Curling Championships. 

It would be the last year where the men's and women's junior tournaments would be held at separate times.

Round-robin standings

Playoffs

References

Ottawa Citizen, February 17, 1986, pg B4
Ottawa Citizen, February 21, 1986, pg B4
Ottawa Citizen, February 22, 1986, pg E3&E4
Ottawa Citizen, February 24, 1986, pg B3

External links
Coverage on CurlingZone

Canadian Junior Curling Championships
Curling competitions in Alberta
Sports competitions in Red Deer, Alberta
Canadian Junior Curling Championships
1986 in Alberta
February 1986 sports events in Canada